Pál Mácsai (born 1961) is a Hungarian actor, director, managing director.

A member of Pinceszínház (Cellar Theatre) during his secondary school years in Budapest, he earned diplomas from the acting and directing departments of the Academy of Theatre and Film (1984 and 1990, respectively). While a third-year student, he debuted as Romeo at the National Theatre, and he was a company member there for five years after earning his diploma in 1984. Beginning in 1998, he enrolled in the aesthetics program at ELTE (Eötvös Loránd University), but discontinued his studies there in 2001, after submitting and winning a tender for the artistic management of the Madách Kamara (Madách Chamber Theatre, capacity: 386). After three seasons, he founded the Örkény István Theatre, which operates in the same building, with an independent company. They adopted the name of the writer at his suggestion, and Mácsai remains the company's leader to this day. Together they reformed the repertoire (formerly light entertainment) with prose pieces based upon the traditions of artistic theatre, thus attracting a new audience of mostly young people and intellectuals, while still keeping a portion of the earlier audience used to more commercial fare. Since 2010, he has served as managing director of Örkény Theatre, which has become, in the past  20 years under his leadership, one of the most significant venues of Hungarian theatre. Professionally, too, the theatre has been crowned with success, winning nearly 100  festival prizes and critics’ awards. In the past 15 years as director, Mácsai has assembled a company where actors (with a distinctive style, consistent in quality and open-minded) can exercise their optimum talents. Additionally, he has been able to forge strong and productive working relationships with the most excellent directors in Hungary's theatre life.

The Örkény Theatre's style reflects a concept that is rooted in realistic traditions, but then clearly progresses beyond them. Their performances are characterised by irony (either soft-spoken or outspoken) and objectivity (either subtle or evident). Without exception, they increasingly rely on the spectator's playfulness and intellectual participation. In addition to being successful with audiences, the productions reflect uncompromising standards of taste and professional quality. As managing director of the Örkény, Mácsai considers it the theatre's most important task to present shows that address the world around us. He often takes socio-political risks with the plays chosen for the program – not only in the sense of challenging the audience, but in terms of aesthetics as well, with new approaches to classic pieces. The theatre also regularly performs contemporary literature, with a repertoire extending from works of antiquity to modern-day authors. The Örkény Theatre does not place limits on genre. Although primarily a theatre for prose drama, its program also features musical works.

An important part of the Örkény's artistic profile is the theatre pedagogy program IRAM (Youth Division and Creative Workshop) which aims to broaden adolescents’ theatre sensibilities and artistic horizons.  In 2019, the theatre established the Örkény – KÖZ Program. It focuses on matters of society and public life and provides the framework for the first production at a permanent Hungarian theatre where actors and non-professionals will perform together onstage.

Principle theatre roles: Romeo, William Shakespeare's Romeo and Juliet;  Liliomfi, Ede Szigligeti's Liliomfi; Cipolla, Thomas Mann's Mario and the Magician; Thomas Becket, Jean Anouilh's Becket; or, The Honour of God;  Antony, William Shakespeare's Julius Caesar; and Sztomil, Sławomir Mrożek's Tango, Professor Bernhardi in Schnitzler's The Bernhardi-case. István Örkény has been an important author in his career, both as an actor and director. Mácsai assembled his one-man show Tell us a Story, Pista! from Örkény's writing, and it is still on the program after more than 700 performances.

He has performed in numerous television shows and films, and he has participated in some 50 radio programs as either an actor or director. Highlights from his film career include Árpád Sopsits’ Torzók (Abandoned), for which he won the Best Supporting Actor Award at the 32nd Annual Hungarian Film Review, and the lead role in the television series Terápia (In Treatment) over multiple seasons, for which he won the Best Leading Actor Award for TV-series two times, in 2005 and 2007.

His relationship with Hungarian literature (and, specifically, the traditions of Hungarian poetry) is well known. For nearly 25 years, he has been a constant feature of Hungarian Television's Lyukasóra program, to analyze and popularize poetry. In the theatre's repertoire, he has also directed several poetry evenings.

Besides his film and theatre roles, he is also known for his vast body of directorial work, which has also reaped professional awards. Highlights include William Shakespeare's Winter's Tale, Howard Barker's Scenes from an Execution, Ferenc Molnár's Glass Slipper, István Tasnádi's Finito, Arthur Miller's A View from the Bridge and The death of a Salesman, István Örkény's Catsplay and The Toth Family, Alfred Jarry's Ubu Rex, Shakespeare's Henry the IV.

He was awarded the Jászai Mari Prize in 1991, the Award for Artistic Excellence in 2008, the Hungarian Legion of Honour's Distinguished Cross in 2013, and the Kossuth Prize in 2014.

Selected filmography

References

External links 

1961 births
Living people
Hungarian male film actors